Endlicheria is a neotropical plant genus consisting of approximately 60 species, occurring mostly in northern South America and the Amazon region. Most species are medium-sized trees, sometime up to 40 metres in height, but a few species are shrubs. DNA molecular data shows that it is closely related to Rhodostemonodaphne and Ocotea.

This genus has many species of high commercial value to the wood industry.

Endlicheria species occur mostly in the drainage area of the Amazon from South America, and low coast rainforest and mountain tropical forest in the Greater Antilles, Guianas, Ecuador, Colombia, Venezuela, Peru, Bolivia, Paraguay, to the south of Brazil, and in the Andean cloud forest in tropical America. The species of Endlicheria occur in moist forest habitats from elevations of around sea level to 2.500 meters in the Andean and Guianian highlands. At least two species are present in mountain cloud forest and Atlantic forest of south east Brazil, and two other species in Caribbean Lesser Antilles mountain cloud forest.

Taxonomy
Traditionally, Endlicheria was placed near Aniba and the other Lauraceae with two locellate anthers. However, it has been suggested that the two-locellate anthers that distinguish Endlicheria from Rhodostemonodaphne evolved repeatedly. The two genera form a group of approximately 100 known species.

Characteristics 
Leaves congested at the apex of the branches, flowers in panicles with racemose endings.

The plants are dioecious, i.e., male and female flowers appear on different trees.

Selected species 
Endlicheria acuminata Kosterm.	
Endlicheria anomala (Nees) Mez	
Endlicheria arachnocome Chanderb.
Endlicheria arenosa Chanderb.	
Endlicheria argentea Chanderb.
Endlicheria bracteata Mez	
Endlicheria bracteolata (Meisn.) C.K.Allen
Endlicheria browniana (Meisn.) Mez	
Endlicheria chalisea Chanderb.		
Endlicheria citriodora 
Endlicheria chrysovelutina Chanderb.
Endlicheria cocuirey Kosterm.
Endlicheria columbiana (Meissner) Mez
Endlicheria gracilis Kosterm.
Endlicheria griseosericea Chanderb.
Endlicheria klugii O.C.Schmidt
Endlicheria krukovii (A.C.Sm.) Kosterm.
Endlicheria robusta (A.C.Sm.) Kosterm.
Endlicheria tschudyana (Lasser) Kosterm.
Endlicheria verticillata Mez
Endlicheria vinotincta C.K.Allen
Endlicheria williamsii O.C.Schmidt
Endlicheria xerampela Chanderb.

References

External links 

 http://lauraceae.myspecies.info/category/lauraceae/lauraceae/endlicheria
 Endlicheria in Bolivia checklist

 
Dioecious plants